Corey James Lanerie (born November 13, 1974) is a jockey in American Thoroughbred horse racing. Based in Kentucky, he has been the leading rider at Churchill Downs, having won the most races during a race meet, 19 times; currently holding the record. He has also been named the leading rider at Ellis Park, Lone Star Park, Sam Houston Race Park and Retama Park.

Lanerie was born in Lafayette, Louisiana. His father had been a jockey before becoming a horse trainer, and Lanerie's grandfather also was a trainer. When Lanerie was nine years old, he began exercising race horses. He learned race riding at a farm near Opelousas and started his jockey career at small unrecognized tracks. He began to ride professionally in 1991, and won his first race on April 19 of that year at Evangeline Downs on a horse named High Hopes Banquet. He won his first stakes race the following year in the Black Gold Stakes at the Fair Grounds in New Orleans, Louisiana. Lanerie's first graded stakes race win was the Razorback Handicap at Oaklawn Park in 1999.

Lanerie falls within a tradition of "Cajun" jockeys who developed their riding skills in their home state prior to achieving success at major tracks, and follows in the footsteps of other Louisiana natives such as Calvin Borel, Kent Desormeaux, and Eddie Delahoussaye, each of whom was inducted into the Horse Racing Hall of Fame. Lanerie won the George Woolf Memorial Jockey Award in 2014, an honor bestowed upon him by a vote of his fellow jockeys. He is noted for being respected and well-liked by his peers.

Lanerie once said, "I know Churchill better than anybody." But in spite of his success at Churchill Downs, Lanerie has only ridden three times in the Kentucky Derby: on Harry's Holiday in 2014, finishing 16th, Mo Tom in 2016, finishing eighth  and a second-place finish on Looking at Lee in 2017, his best result to date. He also hit the board in three Breeders' Cup races in 2015 when the meet was held at Keeneland, placing second in the Breeders' Cup Marathon and third in both the Breeders' Cup Juvenile and Breeders' Cup Juvenile Fillies.

His home base is in Louisville, Kentucky, where he lives with his daughter. His wife, Shantel, died on June 22, 2018.

Year-end charts

References

1974 births
Living people
Sportspeople from Lafayette, Louisiana
Jockeys from Louisville, Kentucky
American jockeys
Cajun jockeys